The 2007 Kirkuk bombings were a series of 3 suicide and car bomb attacks that occurred on July 16, 2007, in the northern Iraqi oil city of Kirkuk. The bombing killed 86 people with up to 180 injured.

The first bomb, which caused most of the casualties, exploded in a crowded market  close to the offices of the Patriotic Union of Kurdistan, a Kurdish political party led by Iraqi President Jalal Talabani. The massive explosion left a crater several metres deep. More than 20 cars were destroyed and two buildings collapsed completely.

The second attack minutes later targeted a bus station at a nearby market in a commercial area called Iskan and wounded one civilian.

Several hours later, a car bomb exploded in southern Kirkuk, killing a police officer and wounding six others. A fourth car bomb was discovered and made safe.

References

2007 murders in Iraq
Suicide car and truck bombings in Iraq
Terrorist incidents in Iraq in 2007
Mass murder in 2007
July 2007 events in Iraq
2007